The 2010 Eneco Tour was the sixth edition of the Eneco Tour cycling stage race. It took place from 17 August to 24 August 2010 in the Benelux. Like the previous years, parts of the Netherlands and Belgium were covered. It was part of the UCI World Ranking. It began with a short individual time trial in Steenwijk and ended with a longer one in Genk.

Schedule

Teams
Twenty one teams have been invited to the 2010 Eneco Tour of which 18 teams are from the UCI Pro Tour

3 teams were awarded a wildcard invitation:

Stages

Prologue
17 August 2010 – Steenwijk (Netherlands),

Stage 1
18 August 2010 – Steenwijk (Netherlands) to Rhenen (Netherlands),

Stage 2
19 August 2010 – Sint Willebrord (Netherlands) to Ardooie (Belgium),

Stage 3
20 August 2010 – Ronse (Belgium),

Stage 4
21 August 2010 – Sint-Lievens-Houtem (Belgium) to Roermond (Netherlands),

Stage 5
22 August 2010 – Roermond (Netherlands) to Sittard (Netherlands),

Stage 6
23 August 2010 – Bilzen (Belgium) to Heers (Belgium),

Stage 7
24 August 2010 – Genk (Belgium),

Final standings

General classification

Points classification

Young Riders' classification

Team classification

Classification leadership table

References

External links
Race website

Eneco Tour
Benelux Tour
Eneco Tour
Eneco
Eneco